David Charles Brown (February 22, 1933 – June 15, 2009) was a basketball coach who briefly coached the Dallas Chaparrals of the American Basketball Association in 1973. He was born in Green Bay, Wisconsin and graduated from Edgewood High School of the Sacred Heart in Madison, Wisconsin.

References

External links
 BasketballReference.com: Dave Brown

1933 births
2009 deaths
Dallas Chaparrals head coaches
Basketball coaches from Wisconsin
Sportspeople from Green Bay, Wisconsin
Sportspeople from Madison, Wisconsin
Wisconsin Badgers men's basketball coaches